The Mitsubishi Fuso Rosa (kana: 三菱ふそう・ローザ) is a Japanese minibus based on the Mitsubishi Fuso Canter manufactured by Mitsubishi Fuso Truck and Bus Corporation. The Mitsubishi Fuso Rosa was launched in 1960 and is now in its fifth generation, known as the BE7. In Japan, Asia-Pacific, Mid-East, Africa, Jamaica and South America, its principal competitors are the Isuzu Journey, Nissan Civilian, Mazda Parkway and Toyota Coaster.

History
The Mitsubishi Rosa was launched in 1960 by the Mitsubishi Heavy Industries (formerly China-Japan Heavy Industries) and was called Mitsubishi Rosa. In 1964, three companies merged with the Mitsubishi Heavy Industries to become a new Mitsubishi Heavy Industries, and the Mitsubishi Rosa became a Mitsubishi Fuso product to replace the Fuso MB720 minibus in 1966.

First generation (1960-1973)

Mitsubishi officially launched the Rosa minibus in 1960. At that time, the factory was coded as B10 and developed from the chassis of the original Mitsubishi Jupiter T10 truck. Its body style is similar to the Mercedes-Benz O 319 minibus, with a length of approximately 5.4 meters.

In the following year (1961), Mitsubishi evolved to B20 on the basis of B10, which is an extended version of B10, which ranges from 6.25 to 7 meters in length.

Second generation (1973-1986)
In 1973 Mitsubishi released the second generation, which is similar as the first generation, the main difference is the design of the front has been largely revised, and a large number of components can be shared with the Mitsubishi trucks. In the beginning, there was BC2 (short-range gasoline version), BE2 (short-range diesel version) and BH2 (long-range diesel version). In 1981, the BK2 series was introduced (long-range version with a width of 2.3 meters).

Third generation (1986-1997)
The third generation version of the body launched in 1986 was very different from the original and second generation. The most prominent change was the newly designed body, which introduced a large number of ergonomic designs. Like the previous two generations, the third generation minibus Rosa has short (6.2 meters long) and long (6.95 meters long) versions, but both only have engines of four cylinders. As for the headlights have a round or square lamp version, some of which are equipped with command lights on the side of the vehicle. 
In 1990, Mitsubishi Rosa received a facelift, the distance between the two headlights was extended and the command light on the vehicle side was installed. They also offered automatic transmission, independent shock absorber and reclining seats options. It was at this time that Rosa added a four-wheel drive version for the first time.

Fourth generation (1997-Present)

The fourth generation (BE6 series) is an improved version of the third generation. The design of the body of the car was greatly modified, and the distance between the front axle and the door was considerably reduced. In addition, the taillights are round, different from the second and third generation. There are both Automatic and Manual models available. In 1998, a super long body was added to the line-up, bringing the maximum capacity of all the vehicle to 34 people. In 2002, natural gas engine were offered to the Mitsubishi Rosa. Transmac in Macau was supplied with a (dual-doors version fitted with electronic route display).

Body types

 Short body (6.25 meters in length, 16- or 25-seater)
 Long body (7 meters in length, 16-, 23-, 25- or 28-seater)
 Super long body (7.73 meters in length, 23-, 24-, 29- or 33-seater)
 Kindergarten buses have a seating capacity of up to 39/41 (3x2 seat configuration), rear doors, auto door, automatic transmission.

See also

Mitsubishi Fuso Truck & Bus Corporation

References

External links

Product description in Mitsubishi Fuso Rosa Worldwide website
Product description in Mitsubishi Fuso Rosa New Zealand website
Fuso Rosa (Australia)
Fusa Rosa Inspection Checklist download 

Buses
Minibuses
Rosa
Cab over vehicles
Buses of Japan
Vehicles introduced in 1960